Medhi Bouzzine (born 9 February 1984) is a French former pair skater. He competed with Mélodie Chataigner from 2005 to 2011, winning six French national medals and placing 8th at the 2008 European Championships.

Programs 
(with Chataigner)

Competitive highlights 
(with Chataigner)

References

External links 
 

French male pair skaters
1984 births
Figure skaters from Paris
Living people